Donnell Bennett, Jr. (born September 14, 1972) is a former American football fullback in the National Football League for the Kansas City Chiefs and the Washington Redskins.

Bennett attended Cardinal Gibbons High School. He played college football at the University of Miami and was drafted in the second round of the 1994 NFL Draft. He is married to Adrienne Bennett and has four sons: Matthew, Donnell III, Coleman, and Caden.

External links
NFL.com player page

References

1972 births
Living people
American football fullbacks
Miami Hurricanes football players
Kansas City Chiefs players
Washington Redskins players
Players of American football from Fort Lauderdale, Florida